The Only Investment Guide You'll Ever Need is a financial guide written by Andrew Tobias that was originally published in 1978. The book includes advice on topics such as savings, investments, and preparing for retirement. As of 2016, it has sold over one million copies.

See also
The Invisible Bankers: Everything the Insurance Industry Never Wanted You to Know (book)

References

Finance books
1978 non-fiction books
American non-fiction books